Menomonie is a city in and the county seat of Dunn County in the western part of the U.S. state of Wisconsin. The city's population was 16,843 as of the 2020 census.

Named for the original inhabitants of the area, the Menominee, the city forms the core of the United States Census Bureau's Menomonie Micropolitan Statistical Area (MSA), which includes all of Dunn County (2010 population: 43,857). The Menomonie MSA and the Eau Claire–Chippewa Falls metropolitan area to the east form the Census Bureau's Eau Claire-Menomonie Consolidated Metropolitan Statistical Area.

The city center is at the south end of Lake Menomin, a reservoir on the Red Cedar River.

History

The earliest known residents of the area were people from the Trempealeau Hopewell Culture of the Middle Woodland Period (100–400 CE). Evidence from their culture includes a mound from the Wakanda Mounds Group in Wakanda Park, along the western shore of Lake Menomin. Most of these mounds are thought to be from Effigy Mound cultures from this time period. Artifacts from the Late Woodland Period (400–1000 CE) have also been uncovered. It is theorized that agricultural villages supported the population during summer months, transitioning to hunting and gathering from fall through spring. The next known population group is the Santee Dakota in the 1600s and 1700s, who engaged in conflicts with the Ojibwe people, who migrated west as refugees. Armed with European weapons, the Ojibwe pushed westward, eventually winning at the Battle of Kathio in 1770. The two tribes continued their warfare, eventually signing the 1825 First Treaty of Prairie du Chien, which made a border between the two just north of Menomonie, with the Dakota claiming the southern lands.

In 1788, French-Canadian fur trader and schoolmaster Jean Baptiste Perrault established a trading post and fort on the Red Cedar River very near Menomonie.

The lumber industry brought Menomonie permanent settlement and economic prosperity in the 1800s. Hardin Perkins established the first sawmill at the confluence of Wilson Creek and the Red Cedar River in 1822 on behalf of fur traders James H. Lockwood and Joseph Rolette of Prairie du Chien. The mill was washed away by a sudden overflow in the river within a year. Working with Indian Agent General Street, Perkins, Lockwood and Rolette began a legal battle over the authority of the local Native American people to grant permissions of this sort, exchanging land for payment of blankets, beads, whiskey, and other merchandise to Dakota Chief Wapasha II and other Ojibwe chiefs. In 1830 the traders received permission from the federal government to rebuild their lumber operation. This was the first permanent settlement on the land that became the city of Menomonie.

Lockwood built a second mill and dam on the west side of the Red Cedar River, at the confluence of Gilbert Creek. He sold this to Hiram S. Allen, a lumberman from Vermont. In 1839, Allen built a new sawmill in its place, which he sold to the McCann brothers, settlers from Ohio who later became the first permanent residents of Eau Claire. In 1849, the Gilbert Creek Mill became the site of the first post office.

Lockwood and Rolette sold their original operation to James Green in 1841, who turned over the deed to William Black in 1842. In 1846, William Wilson and John Holly Knapp jointly purchased the mill, naming it Black & Knapp Mill. Wilson and his family settled in the area, eventually building what is now the Wilson Place Museum in 1859. Wilson founded the city of Menomonie and became its first mayor in 1882, as well as a Wisconsin State Senator.

Captain Andrew Tainter and Henry L. Stout acquired  interest in Wilson and Knapp's company, forming Knapp, Stout & Co. in 1853, the company that would come to define the town for generations. Tainter was a silent partner, whose duties included shipping lumber down to the Mississippi River and returning with supplies. By 1873, Knapp, Stout & Co. had become the world's largest lumber corporation. In 43 years, its output grew from 100,000 to 5,706,602 feet of lumber. It had 1,200 employees and owned  of pine forest. The post office was moved to the site of the Knapp, Stout & Co. Company in 1855, with Wilson as postmaster.

Menomonie was incorporated as a city in 1882.

The Mabel Tainter Memorial Building, a local landmark, was built in 1890 and dedicated on July 3, 1890, by Tainter in honor of his daughter Mabel, who had died in 1886 at the age of 19. In 1891, Wisconsin State Senator James Huff Stout, son of Henry L. Stout, founded a manual training school, the first of several educational enterprises he launched in Menomonie. These educational programs were combined into the Stout Institute in 1908, and still stand as the University of Wisconsin–Stout.

In 1901, the water mill shut down and Knapp, Stout & Co. closed operations in the area. The Wisconsin Power Company and Submerged Electric Motor Co. acquired some of the company's facilities, the latter to house the world's first outboard motor factory. In 1902, the Wilson-Weber Lumber Company took over retail operations of the Knapp, Stout & Co. That same year, Menomonie founded the nation's first agricultural high school, the Dunn County School of Agriculture and Domestic Economy.

Geography
Menomonie is located at  (44.879, −91.918).

The city lies on Interstate 94, State Highway 25 (which serves as the main north–south thoroughfare through town), State Highway 29, and US Highway 12.

Climate

Demographics

2020 census 
As of the census of 2020, there were 16,843 people. The racial makeup of the city was 88.1% White, 4.4% Asian, 1.7% Black or African American, 0.5% Native American, 0.9% from other races, and 4.5% from two or more races. Ethnically, the population was 2.8% Hispanic or Latino of any race.

2010 census
As of the census of 2010, there were 16,264 people, 5,743 households, and 2,455 families living in the city. The racial makeup of the city was 91.9% White, 0.8% African American, 0.5% Native American, 4.2% Asian, 0.6% from other races, and 1.9% from two or more races. Hispanic or Latino of any race were 1.7% of the population.

There were 5,743 households, of which 20.1% had children under the age of 18 living with them, 30.9% were married couples living together, 8.4% had a female householder with no husband present, 3.4% had a male householder with no wife present, and 57.3% were non-families. 36.1% of all households were made up of individuals, and 12.7% had someone living alone who was 65 years of age or older. The average household size was 2.26 and the average family size was 2.87.

The median age in the city was 23.4 years. 13.4% of residents were under the age of 18; 42% were between the ages of 18 and 24; 18.5% were from 25 to 44; 14.9% were from 45 to 64; and 11% were 65 years of age or older. The gender makeup of the city was 49.5% male and 50.5% female.

It is important to remember that a large percentage of the 42% between 18 and 24 were students at the University of Wisconsin-Stout.

2000 census
As of the 2000 census, there were 14,937 people, 5,119 households, and 2,370 families living in the city. The population density was 1,160.7 people per square mile (448.1/km2). There were 5,441 housing units at an average density of 422.8 per square mile (163.2/km2). The racial makeup of the city was 93.79% White, 0.76% Black or African American, 0.41% Native American, 3.21% Asian, 0.01% Pacific Islander, 0.64% from other races, and 1.18% from two or more races. 1.14% of the population were Hispanic or Latino of any race.

There were 5,119 households, out of which 22.6% had children under the age of 18 living with them, 36.0% were married couples living together, 7.5% had a female householder with no husband present, and 53.7% were non-families. 32.7% of all households were made up of individuals, and 11.1% had someone living alone who was 65 years of age or older. The average household size was 2.35 and the average family size was 2.95.

In the city, the population was spread out, with 15.5% under the age of 18, 40.4% from 18 to 24, 20.5% from 25 to 44, 12.3% from 45 to 64, and 11.3% who were 65 years of age or older. The median age was 23 years. For every 100 females, there were 99.1 males. For every 100 females age 18 and over, there were 98.6 males.

The median income for a household in the city was $31,103, and the median income for a family was $44,458. Males had a median income of $30,893 versus $21,898 for females. The per capita income for the city was $15,994. About 9.1% of families and 23.5% of the population were below the poverty line, including 16.7% of those under age 18 and 7.3% of those age 65 or over.

Transportation

Dunn County Transit
Dunn County Transit is Menomonie's public transportation system. It is owned and operated by Dunn County.

Services
The transit system operates two routes. The Community Route serves Menomonie at large; the Stout Route serves only UW-Stout but is open to the general public. These routes run as follows:

Community Route: 7:37am – 4:09pm Monday through Friday and 8:53am – 12:09pm on Saturdays
Stout Route: 7:17am – 9:09pm Monday through Friday

Ridership

Menomonie Municipal Airport (KLUM) serves the city and surrounding communities.

Education

Menomonie schools are part of the Menomonie Area School District.

The city has one public high school, Menomonie High School, and one public middle school, Menomonie Middle School. There are five public elementary schools in the district: River Heights Elementary, Wakanda Elementary, Oaklawn Elementary], Downsville Elementary, and Knapp Elementary.

St. Paul's Lutheran School is a Christian Pre-K–8 school of the Wisconsin Evangelical Lutheran Synod (WELS) in Menomonie.

The city is home to the University of Wisconsin–Stout and a campus of Chippewa Valley Technical College.

Jail 
Dunn County Jail is on Menomonie's eastern edge. It houses sentenced and non-sentenced, male and female inmates. As of July 2020, there are just over 80 inmates.

Media
 The Menomonie Times, a weekly newspaper published 1876–1909, 
 The Menomonie Badger, a weekly newspaper published in 1903 and 1904
 The Dunn County News

Honors
In 2012, Menomonie was ranked #15 in Smithsonians "The 20 Best Small Towns in America".

Notable people

 Stewart J. Bailey, Wisconsin legislator
 Bill Bakke, ski jumper who competed in the 1968 Winter Olympics
 G. H. Bakke, Wisconsin legislator
 Alvin J. Baldus, U.S. Representative
 Wilfred Duford, NFL player
 Rockwell J. Flint, Wisconsin state legislator and newspaper editor
 Vern Fuller, MLB player
 Neil Gaiman, writer and screenwriter, has lived near Menomonie since 1992
 John Paul Gerber, author and historian
 Wilson Hall, half of the comedy duo God's Pottery
 Tim Harmston, stand-up comedian
 Lorenzo D. Harvey, educator
 Luke Helder, University of Wisconsin—Stout student who attempted to create a smiley-face on the US map with pipe bombs
 Ethan Iverson, jazz pianist and founding member of The Bad Plus
 Warren S. Johnson, founder of Johnson Controls and former school principal in Menomonie in the late 19th century
 Ellen Kort, Wisconsin's first Poet Laureate, grew up in Menomonie
 Reynold Kraft, NFL player
 Tim Krumrie, Pro Bowl (1987–1988), nose tackle for the Cincinnati Bengals
 Robert Macauley, Wisconsin legislator and jurist
 Harry Miller,  "the greatest creative figure in the history of the American racing car" 
 Tom Neumann, professional football player
 Marvin Panch, stock car racing driver, winner of 1961 Daytona 500
 Sewell A. Peterson, politician
 Joe Plouff, politician
 Charles Sanna, inventor of Swiss Miss instant hot chocolate
 Richard Shoemaker, Wisconsin legislator
 Nate Stanley, NFL player
 Earl L. Stendahl, art dealer
 James Huff Stout, legislator and businessman
 Jeremiah Burnham Tainter, engineer
 Tom Wiedenbauer, Major League Baseball outfielder and first-base coach for the Cleveland Indians
 Aaron Yonda, comedy video producer

Notable attractions 
 The Mabel Tainter Theater
 Hoffman Hills State Recreation Area
 Lucette Brewing Company
Red Cedar State Trail

In popular culture
 Caddie Woodlawn, a Newbery Award-winning novel, is based on the girlhood adventures of Caroline Augusta Woodhouse, who lived about 10 miles south of Menomonie. The novel is by Woodhouse's granddaughter, Carol Ryrie Brink, and was published in 1936. There is a historical marker in the wayside park near the Woodhouse house.
The fictional town of Lakeside in Neil Gaiman's novel American Gods may be based on Menomonie.
The eighth episode of season 11 of the television show Supernatural takes place in Menomonie.

Sister cities
Menomonie has two sister city relationships:
  Nasukarasuyama, Japan
  Konakovo, Russia

See also
Kraft State Bank robbery

References

Further reading

External links

 City of Menomonie
 Menomonie Business Directory
 Menomonie LocalWiki
 Menomonie Taxi

Cities in Wisconsin
Cities in Dunn County, Wisconsin
Micropolitan areas of Wisconsin
County seats in Wisconsin
Populated places established in 1788
1788 establishments in the Northwest Territory
Wisconsin placenames of Native American origin